Finnley Hugh Allen (born 22 April 1999) is a New Zealand International cricketer, who has played for the New Zealand cricket team since March 2021. He plays domestic cricket for Wellington, and has played in a variety of T20 Franchise leagues, including for RCB in the IPL.

Career
Allen made his Twenty20 debut for Auckland in the 2016–17 Super Smash on 3 January 2017. Prior to his Twenty20 debut, he was named in New Zealand's squad for the 2016 Under-19 Cricket World Cup.

In December 2017, Allen was named in New Zealand's squad for the 2018 Under-19 Cricket World Cup. He scored the first century of the tournament, with 115 not out against the West Indies on the opening day of the competition. In New Zealand's second game of the tournament, against Kenya, Allen scored a half-century off just 19 balls, the joint-second quickest in Under 19 ODI history. He was the leading run-scorer for New Zealand in the tournament, with 338 runs.

Allen made his List A debut for Auckland in the 2017–18 Ford Trophy on 17 February 2018. He made his first-class debut for Auckland in the 2017–18 Plunket Shield season on 9 March 2018. In September 2018, he was named in the Auckland Aces' squad for the 2018 Abu Dhabi T20 Trophy. In November 2019, in a tour match for the New Zealand XI against England, Allen scored an unbeaten century.

In June 2020, Allen was offered a contract by Wellington ahead of the 2020–21 domestic cricket season,   coming into his own as the tournament leading run-scorer (512, SR 194) as Wellington defended their Super Smash title. Opening partner Devon Conway (455) was second. In March 2021, he was signed by Royal Challengers Bangalore as Josh Philippe's replacement for the 2021 Indian Premier League.

In March 2021, Allen was named in New Zealand's Twenty20 International (T20I) squad for their series against Bangladesh. He made his T20I debut for New Zealand on 28 March 2021, against Bangladesh, scoring 71 in 29 balls in his 3rd game, opening with Martin Guptill. In August 2021, Allen was named in New Zealand's One Day International (ODI) squad for their tour of Pakistan.

In February 2022, Allen was bought by the Royal Challengers Bangalore in the auction for the 2022 Indian Premier League tournament. In April 2022, he was signed by Yorkshire to play in the T20 Blast in England.

In June 2022, Allen was named in New Zealand's ODI squads for their tours of Ireland and Scotland. He made his ODI debut on 10 July 2022, for New Zealand against Ireland. On 27 July, in New Zealand's first match against Scotland, Allen scored his first century in T20I cricket.

References

External links
 

1999 births
Living people
New Zealand cricketers
New Zealand One Day International cricketers
New Zealand Twenty20 International cricketers
Auckland cricketers
Wellington cricketers
Cricketers from Auckland
Lancashire cricketers
Birmingham Phoenix cricketers